Kariem Hussein (born 4 January 1989) is a Swiss athlete who specialises in the 400 metres hurdles. His first major success was the gold medal at the 2014 European Championships in Zürich. His personal best in the event is 48.45, set at a meeting in Zug in 2015 and again at Weltklasse Zürich in 2017.  It is also technically his fastest flat 400m because he has not attempted the distance since 2009 when his PR was 48.58.

Hussein was born in Münsterlingen. His father, a former international volleyball player, is Egyptian and his mother is Swiss.

Doping
On 23 July 2021 he was banned by the Swiss Anti-Doping Agency from competing for 9 months, after a banned substance (nikethamide) was confirmed in the probes taken from him. This decision meant Hussein missed the 2020 Summer Olympics in Tokyo.

Competition record

References

External links

Living people
Swiss male hurdlers
1989 births
People from Kreuzlingen District
Swiss people of Egyptian descent
World Athletics Championships athletes for Switzerland
European Athletics Championships medalists
Athletes (track and field) at the 2016 Summer Olympics
Olympic athletes of Switzerland
Doping cases in athletics
Swiss sportspeople in doping cases
Sportspeople from Thurgau